() is an Italian title, derived from the Latin word  'leader', and a cognate of duke. Mussolini held this title together with that of President of the Council of Ministers: this was the constitutional position which entitled him to rule Italy on behalf of the King of Italy. Founder of the Empire was added for the exclusive use by Mussolini in recognition of his founding of an official legal entity of the Italian Empire on behalf of the King in 1936 following Italy's victory in the Second Italo-Ethiopian War. The position was held by Mussolini until 1943, when he was removed from office by the King and the position of "Duce" was dismantled, while Marshal Pietro Badoglio, 1st Duke of Addis Abeba was appointed .

In September 1943, Mussolini styled himself as the "Duce of the Italian Social Republic", and held the position until the collapse of the Italian Social Republic and his execution in April 1945.

History of the term
The title was used outside its traditional noble sense in some of the publications praising Giuseppe Garibaldi during the Italian unification in 1860, though not taken up officially by Garibaldi himself.

 was more formally used by Victor Emmanuel III in 1915, during World War I, referring to his role as the commander in chief of the armed forces. The term was also used by Gabriele d'Annunzio as dictator of the self-proclaimed Italian Regency of Carnaro in 1920, and most significantly by Italian fascist dictator Benito Mussolini. The first record of the term being used in reference to Mussolini dates to a banquet held in his honor in Forlì in 1912, celebrating his new position as editor-in-chief of Avanti!

Because the title  has become associated with fascism, it is no longer in common use other than in reference to Mussolini. Because of modern anti-fascist sentiment, Italian speakers in general now use other words for leader, mainly including the English loanword.  survives as an antonomasia for Mussolini.

Succession
Mussolini intended that the Grand Council of Fascism would choose a successor from a list of three men chosen by him, and submit the name for approval by the king. As of 1940 he may have been preparing his son-in-law Galeazzo Ciano for the role.

Title holder

See also
 Caudillo
 Conducător
 Doge
 Führer
 Poglavnik
 Roman dictator
 Strongman (politics)
 Supreme Leader (disambiguation)
 Vozhd

References

External links
 

Italian Fascism
Italian Social Republic
Positions of authority
Titles of national or ethnic leadership